Paul R. Mendes-Flohr (born 17 April 1941) is a leading scholar of modern Jewish thought. As an intellectual historian, Mendes-Flohr specializes in 19th and 20th-century Jewish thinkers, including Martin Buber, Franz Rosenzweig, Gershom Scholem and Leo Strauss.

Mendes-Flohr holds a doctorate from Brandeis University, which was supervised by Alexander Altmann, Nahum Glatzer, and Ben Halpern. Mendes-Flohr taught at the University of Chicago, where he is Dorothy Grant Maclear Professor Emeritus of Modern Jewish History and Thought. He is also Professor Emeritus of Jewish Thought at the Hebrew University of Jerusalem.

He is co-author end co-editor, with Jehuda Reinharz, of a book for modern Jewish history, The Jew in the Modern World: A Documentary History, and with Arthur A. Cohen, of a book on contemporary Jewish religious thought.

In 2019, Mendes-Flohr published a highly regarded Martin Buber biography entitled, Martin Buber: A Life of Faith and Dissent. The German translation appeared in 2022 and in Hebrew in 2023. His most recent work, Cultural Disjunctions: Post-Traditional Jewish Identities, was published in 2021. 

In 2021, Mendes-Flohr began work on The Global Lehrhaus, an international platform for education and reflection on issues of common concern. The Global Lehrhaus was inspired by the Freies Jüdisches Lehrhaus (Free House of Jewish Learning), a center for continuing education established by Franz Rosenzweig, and later directed by Martin Buber.

Raised in Brooklyn, New York, Mendes-Flohr has lived in Israel since 1970 where he currently resides with his wife, artist Rita Mendes-Flohr. He has two children, both also artists, and four grandchildren.

Selected works
 Identität. Die zwei Seelen der deutschen Juden
 
 From Mysticism to Dialogue: Martin Buber's Transformation of German Social Thought. Detroit: Wayne State University Press, 1989.
 Franz Rosenzweig and the Possibility of a Jewish Theology (forthcoming)
 
 German Jews: a dual identity 1999
 A land of two peoples: Martin Buber on Jews and Arabs Edited with commentary and a new preface by Paul R. Mendes-Flohr.
 Divided passions: Jewish intellectuals and the experience of modernity (1991)
 Martin Buber: a contemporary perspective (2002)
 
 Martin Buber: a life of faith and dissent (2019)

References

1941 births
Living people
Jewish historians
Israeli historians
Philosophers of Judaism
University of Chicago faculty
Academic staff of the Hebrew University of Jerusalem
Fellows of the American Academy of Arts and Sciences